Uttoxeter Road (also known as Four Trees) is a cricket ground located along the Uttoxeter Road between the villages of Lower Tean and Checkley in Staffordshire. The ground is surrounded on all sides by countryside.

The ground first appears on maps in 1924. Although located in Staffordshire, it was Derbyshire who used the ground for two List A matches, one in the 1991 Refuge Assurance League against Glamorgan and another against Hampshire in the 1993 AXA Equity & Law League. In the first match, Derbyshire made 251 all out from 39 overs, with Alan Warner's 51 the highest score of the innings. Daren Foster returned best figures for Glamorgan, with figures of 3/30. Despite 101 run from Matthew Maynard, Glamorgan fell 29 runs short of their target, with Ewan McCray taking the best figures of the innings with 4/49. The second match was abandoned without a ball bowled.

The ground is also the home of Checkley Cricket Club.

See also
List of cricket grounds in England and Wales

References

External links
Uttoxeter Road at ESPNcricinfo
Uttoxeter Road at CricketArchive

Derbyshire County Cricket Club
Cricket grounds in Staffordshire
Sports venues completed in 1924